Escuela Dante Alighieri is a private Italian international school in Córdoba, Argentina. It serves  jardín (escuela materna), primaria (primary school) through secondaria di II grado (upper secondary school). It was established in 1961.

See also

 Italian Argentine

References

External links
 Escuela Dante Alighieri 

Buildings and structures in Córdoba, Argentina
Italian international schools in Argentina
Educational institutions established in 1961
1961 establishments in Argentina